Ozzero (Milanese:  or  ) is a comune (municipality) in the Province of Milan in the Italian region Lombardy, located about  southwest of Milan.

The municipality of Ozzero contains the frazioni (subdivisions, mainly villages and hamlets) Soria Vecchia and Bugo.

Ozzero borders the following municipalities: Abbiategrasso and Morimondo.

Demographic evolution

References

External links
 www.comune.ozzero.mi.it

Cities and towns in Lombardy